Killingholme Power Station may refer to:

Killingholme A power station
Killingholme B power station
Unbuilt proposed oil and coal fired power station in the civil parish of North Killingholme